Kenneth Byron Callicutt (born August 20, 1955) is a former American football running back in the National Football League who played for the Detroit Lions. He played college football for the Clemson Tigers.

References

1955 births
Living people
American football running backs
American football return specialists
Detroit Lions players
Clemson Tigers football players